The Jameh mosque of Kashan is the oldest historical structure in Kashan, Iran. Its only brick minaret is located in its southeastern corner. On the bottom part of the minaret, there is a kufic inscription made by embossed brick. On the inscription, it is mentioned the construction date of the minaret, which is 1074 AD. The minaret is the third oldest minaret in Iran, which has an inscription. 

It is said to have been converted from a Zoroastrian fire temple that existed before the Arab conquest of Iran.

In the book Merat ol-Boldan, it is written about the mosque as follows:
"The mosque, which is known in Kashan as Jameh mosque , has one mihrab with a right qibla and a mihrab with a wrong qibla. The founder of the mosque was Safie Khatun, Malik al-Ashtar's daughter."

The large old mihrab of the mosque like minaret seems to belongs to the Seljuq era. It has an exquisite stucco, on which there are verses from Quran about the virtue of Friday prayer.  It seems that this large mihrab has been destroyed intentionally because of its false direction of qibla. Instead of this mihrab a smaller one has been built in the true direction of qibla during the reign of Tahmasp I.

The plan of the mosque is simple. There is a howz in the courtyard in front of the iwan, which leads to the inner space of the dome and also two shabestans at grade of the courtyard and a winter shabestan below the surface of the courtyard.

See also 

 List of the historical structures in the Isfahan province

References 

11th-century mosques
Buildings and structures in Kashan
Mosques in Iran
Mosque buildings with domes